Spodnji Ključarovci is a settlement in the Slovene Hills northwest of Ormož in northeastern Slovenia. The area traditionally belonged to the  region of Styria. It is now included in the Drava Statistical Region.

There is a small roadside chapel with a belfry in the southern part of the settlement. It was built in the 1920s.

References

External links
Spodnji Ključarovci on Geopedia

Populated places in the Municipality of Ormož